A list of films produced in Egypt in 1974. For an A-Z list of films currently on Wikipedia, see :Category:Egyptian films.

External links
 Egyptian films of 1974 at the Internet Movie Database
 Egyptian films of 1974 elCinema.com

Lists of Egyptian films by year
1974 in Egypt
Lists of 1974 films by country or language